Meotipa pulcherrima is a species of cobweb spider in the family Theridiidae. It is found in Tropical Africa, and has been introduced into the Americas, Papua New Guinea, China, Korea, Japan, and the Pacific Islands.

References

Further reading

External links

 

Theridiidae
Spiders described in 1917